Sturgeon Heights is a settlement in northern Alberta within the Municipal District of Greenview No. 16, located on Highway 43,  southeast of Grande Prairie.

Localities in the Municipal District of Greenview No. 16